Aurel Croissant (born 1969 in Germany) is professor of political science at the Faculty of Economics and Social Sciences of the University of Heidelberg.

Education 
Croissant received his Dr. Phil. In political science from the University of Mainz (magna cum laude) and his M.A. in political science, sociology and public law from that university, which he graduated with summa cum laude.

Career 
From 2004 to 2006 he was an assistant professor at the Naval Postgraduate School's National Security Affairs Department. In 2006, he joined Heidelberg University as full professor. Croissant teaches undergraduate, graduate and doctoral courses and supervises bachelor's, master's and doctoral theses in political science. His teaching and research focuses on Southeast and East Asian politics, democratization, civil-military relations, security studies and other topics in comparative politics. He has published more than 150 articles and book chapters in English and German which have also been translated into Spanish, Indonesian, Korean, and Russian. Besides, he co-authored 4 books. During 2001–2003, he taught as assistant professor at the Ruprecht-Karls-University in Heidelberg, Germany. He taught and conducted research from 1996 to 2001 at the Johannes Gutenberg-University in Mainz and the University of Heidelberg, both in Germany. He taught and conducted research in Thailand, the Philippines and Korea and served as the co-chair of the Research Council on Democratization of the German Association of Political Science. Since 2012 he is coeditor of the quarterly Democratization. He is a member of the academic advisory board of the Bertelsmann Transformatio Index, and the Sustainable Governance Index.

Books/edited volumes (selection) 
 with Wolfgang Merkel, Hans-Jürgen Puhle and Peter Thiery. Defekte Demokratien Band 2: Regionalanalysen. Wiesbaden: VS Verlag für Sozialwissenschaften, 2006.
 with Wolfgang Merkel, Hans-Jürgen Puhle, Claudia Eicher und Peter Thiery. Defekte Demokratien Band 1: Theorie. Opladen: Leske+Budrich, 2003.
 with Beate Martin, Between Consolidation and Crisis. Elections and Democracy in Five Nations in Southeast Asia, Münster: Lit Verlag, 2006.
 with Beate Martin and Sascha Kneip, The Politics of Death. Political Violence in Southeast Asia, Münster: Lit Verlag, 2006.

Articles 
 Aurel Croissant, David Kuehn, Paul W. Chambers, and Siegfried O. Wolf, Beyond the Fallacy of Coup-ism: Conceptualizing Civilian Control of the Military in Emerging Democracie, Democratization, forthcoming 2010.
 with Daniel Barlow. Terrorist Financing and Government Responses in Southeast Asia, in: Harold Trinkunas and Jeanne Giraldo, eds., Terrorist Financing and Government Responses (Stanford: Stanford University Press, forthcoming).
 Aurel Croissant und David Kuehn, Patterns of Civilian Control of the Military in East Asia's New Democracies, Journal of East Asian Studies, Vol. 9, No. 2, 2009, pp. 187–218.
 The Perils and Promises of Democratization through United Nations Transitional Authority – Lessons from Cambodia and East Timor, Democratization, Vol. 15, No. 3 (2008), pp. 649–668.
 Unrest in South Thailand: Contours, Causes and Consequences of Post-2001 Violence, Contemporary Southeast Asia, vol. 27, no. 1 (2005).
 with Dan Pojar. The Parliamentary Elections in Thailand, February 2005, Electoral Studies 25 (2006), 184–191.
 Muslim Insurgency, Political Violence and Democracy in Thailand, Terrorism and Political Violence, vol. 19, no. 1, January 2007.
 with Daniel Barlow. Following the Money Trail: Terrorist Financing and Government Responses in Southeast Asia, Studies in Conflict and Terrorism, vol. 29, no. 8, December 2006.
 From Transition to Defective Democracy? Mapping Asian Democratization, in: Wolfgang Merkel and Aurel Croissant, eds. Consolidated or defective democracies? Problems of Regime Change, Special Issue of Democratization vol. 11, no. 5 (December 2004), 156–179.
 with Wolfgang Merkel. Introduction, in: Aurel Croissant and Wolfgang Merkel, eds., consolidated or defective democracies? Problems of Regime Change, Special Issue of Democratization vol. 11, no. 5 (December 2004), 1–10.
 with Wolfgang Merkel. Conclusion: Good and Defective Democracies, in: Aurel Croissant and Wolfgang Merkel eds., consolidated or defective democracies? Problems of Regime Change, Special Issue of Democratization vol. 11, no. 5 (December 2004), 199–214.
 Changing Welfare Regimes in East and Southeast Asia, in: Social Policy & Administration, vol. 38, no. 5 (October 2004), 504–524.
 Riding the Tiger. Civil Control and the Military in Democratizing Korea, in: Armed Forces and Society, Volume 30, No. 3 (Fall 2004), 357–381.
 Legislative Powers, Veto Players, and the Emergence of Delegative Democracy. A Comparison of Presidentialism in the Philippines and Korea, in: Democratization, Vol. 10, No. 3 (June 2003), 68–99.
 with Jörn Dosch. Election Note: Thailand's first votes to the Senate and House of Representatives under the 1997 Constitution, in: Electoral Studies, Vol. 22 (Summer 2003), 153–160.
 Majoritarian and Consensual Democracy, Electoral Systems and Democratic Consolidation in Asia, in: Asian Perspective, Vol. 26, No. 2 (Summer 2002), 5―39.

References

1969 births
Johannes Gutenberg University Mainz alumni
German political scientists
Academic staff of Heidelberg University
Living people